Pulev is a Bulgarian male surname, its feminine counterpart is Puleva. Notable people with the surname include:

Kubrat Pulev (born 1981), Bulgarian boxer
Tervel Pulev (born 1983), Bulgarian boxer, brother of Kubrat

Bulgarian-language surnames